The  is a toll road managed and operated by Iwaki Skyline Co., Ltd. in Hirosaki, Japan. It partially ascends Mount Iwaki and is notable for its steep gradient and 69 hairpin turns, which make it considered as one of the most dangerous mountain roads in the world.

Route description
The Tsugaru Iwaki Skyline is a toll road in the outskirts of the city of Hirosaki which partially ascends Mount Iwaki and is notable for its steep gradient and 69 hairpin turns. The road ascends  over an average gradient of 8.66%, with some sections going up to a 10% gradient. The road terminates at the eighth station on Mount Iwaki, a stratovolcano, at which point a chairlift is available from the eighth station to the ninth station. The Tsugaru Iwaki Skyline has been considered one of the most dangerous mountain roads in the world. Both the road and the chairlift are managed and operated by Iwaki Skyline Co., Ltd., a subsidiary of Kōnan Bus Company.

Tolls
The prices listed are for a round trip up and down the road, as of 2017:
Motorcycles: ¥1000
Kei car: ¥1500
Standard-sized car: ¥1800
Mini bus: ¥4500
Large vehicles (defined as 30+ people, or a total weight of at least ): ¥7200
Bicycles: The road is closed to bicycles except in the event of the annual Mount Iwaki Hill Climb Challenge, which takes place in late June.

History
Construction on the Tsugaru Iwaki Skyline began in April 1958. When the road opened on 25 August 1960 as part of the Kōnan Bus Expressway Division it was the first toll road in Aomori Prefecture. In 1972 a one-way chairlift was added, starting from the eighth station, where the road ends, up to the 9th station. In 1993 the chairlift was upgraded to allow for two-way travel. In April 1999, the company operating Tsugaru Iwaki Skyline and the chairlift changed its name to "Iwaki Skyline Co., Ltd."

Major intersections
The route lies entirely within Aomori Prefecture.

See also
Mount Iwaki
Hakkōda Ropeway

References

External links
 Tsugaru Iwaki Skyline
Google Maps Satellite View

Tourist attractions in Aomori Prefecture
Roads in Aomori Prefecture
Toll roads in Japan